Khoon Ka Rishta ( Blood Relation) is a 1981 Hindi-language action film, produced by Siraj Darpan, Amar Roy, Harilal J. Thakker and Kusumlata J. Thakker under the Sangtarash Internanationals banner and directed by Samir Ganguly. It stars Jeetendra, Neetu Singh, Amjad Khan, Pran  and music composed by Kalyanji Anandji.

Plot
Justice Surendra Sinha (Pran) is an honest man who is a disciple of justice, he dishonestly gives judgment against his step-brother Kailash (Amjad Khan) for his crimes, a sentence of 14 years imprisonment. Faced with a moral dilemma, he resigns and migrates to his native village where his primary mission becomes to open a girls' college on his land, with donations from the villagers. Meanwhile, his son Ravi (Jeetendra) grows up to qualify as a civil engineer, who although disillusioned by the free work of his father, agrees to help him in building the girl's college. Things take a bad turn with the release of Kailash from jail, who puts his dirty money in a construction company and in a bid to seek revenge, gets the college donation money stolen from Surendra Sinha's house and the parents wrongly accuse their son Ravi of the theft. Ravi leaves the village and with the help of his lover, Sonia (Neetu Singh) erroneously gets employed in the construction company of Kailash Nath, without knowing that the company has defrauded on various sites leading to deaths, and he gets accused. Meanwhile, the target date of Holi for constructing the girl's college approaches and Surendra Sinha is kidnapped by Kailash Nath, who is also party to the murder of Vijay who is the brother to Sonia. An exact duplicate of Justice Surendra Sinha is procured by Kailash Nath.

Cast

Jeetendra as Ravi
Neetu Singh as Sonia
Amjad Khan as Kailash
Pran as Justice Surendra Sinha

Soundtrack 
All songs are written by Majrooh Sultanpuri.

References

1980s Hindi-language films
Films scored by Kalyanji Anandji
Films directed by Samir Ganguly
Indian action drama films

External links